Franko Kaštropil (born March 8, 1984) is a Croatian professional basketball player who plays for TV Idstein in the German 2. Regionalliga (5th national division).

References

External links
 Franko Kaštropil Basketball Player Profile on Eurobasket.com
 Franko Kaštropil Basketball Player Profile on RealGM.com
 Franko Kaštropil Basketball Player Profile on Euroleague.com

1984 births
Living people
ABA League players
Centers (basketball)
Croatian men's basketball players
KK Cedevita players
KK Split players
Basketball players from Split, Croatia
HKK Široki players
KK Zagreb players
KK Zadar players
APOEL B.C. players
Lille Métropole BC players
Apollon Limassol BC players
BC Yambol players
GKK Šibenik players
KK Jazine Arbanasi players